Carter Broadcasting is a New England based broadcasting group owned by Ken Carberry.  Its headquarters are in Braintree, Massachusetts.

Currently-owned stations

Massachusetts (2 stations)
WACE/730: Chicopee (sale to Holy Family Communications pending).
WCRN/830: Worcester

Former stations

Maine
WLOB/1310:  Portland (1980-2000)
WWMR/96.3: Rumford (1987-2000)

Massachusetts
WROL/950: Boston

Rhode Island
WRIB/1220: Providence (1978-2006)

References
WACE's website
WCRN's website

Radio broadcasting companies of the United States